Andrew Campbell Eaton (born 7 December 1959) is a film and television producer.  He was educated at Campbell College and Churchill College, graduating with a BA in 1982. In 1994, he co-founded Revolution Films.

References

External links

People educated at Campbell College
Living people
British film producers
1960 births
Film producers from Northern Ireland
Filmmakers who won the Best Foreign Language Film BAFTA Award